Cheshmeh Pahn-e Nanaj (also Romanized as Cheshmeh Pahn Nanaj; also known as Chashmeh Pahn, Cheshmeh Pahn, and Cheshmeh Pahn Tataj) is a village in Jowkar Rural District, Jowkar District, Malayer County, Hamadan Province, Iran. At the 2006 census, its population was 185, in 36 families.

References 

Populated places in Malayer County